Fler is the self-titled fourth solo studio album by German rapper Fler, released 27 March 2009. It was his last work released via Aggro Berlin.

Musical content
The album contains besides battle rap-like tracks, also deeper and personal songs that therms Fler's difficult and reflective past about his arrest in a psychiatry ("Mein Haus") and his school time ("Schulsong"). In the songs "Ewigkeit" and "Ich werde nie vergessen", Fler reviewed past moments that had affected him the most.

Track listing

Samples
The melody of "Ich sing nicht mehr für dich" is similar to "My Life" by Game feat. Lil Wayne
"Mein Haus" contains an interpolation of "Our House" by Madness

References 

Fler albums
2009 albums
German-language albums